Odell Lawson (December 20, 1948 —  February 14, 2008) was an American football running back who played in the American Football League. He played college football at Langston.

Early life and high school
Lawson was born and grew up in Ponca City, Oklahoma and attended Ponca City High School. He was named All-State as a senior in 1965.

College career
Lawson was named All-Oklahoma Collegiate Conference as a sophomore and as a senior. He rushed for over 2,000 yards in his collegiate career.

Professional career
Lawson was selected by the Boston Patriots in the seventh round of the 1970 NFL Draft. He was named the Patriot's rookie of the year after rushing for 99 yards on 56 carries, gaining 113 yards on 11 receptions, and returning 25 kickoffs for 546 yards. Lawson suffered a season-ending injury two games into the 1971 season. He was cut by the Patriots at the end of training camp in 1972.

Lawson was signed by the San Francisco 49ers during the 1973 offseason, but was waived at the end of training camp. He was claimed off waivers by the New Orleans Saints and spent the next two seasons with the team.

References

1948 births
2008 deaths
Langston Lions football players
Players of American football from Oklahoma
Boston Patriots players
New England Patriots players
New Orleans Saints players
American football running backs